Jemo Island Atoll (Marshallese:  or) is an uninhabited coral island in the Pacific Ocean, in the Ratak Chain of the Marshall Islands north-east of Likiep Atoll. The island is oval-shaped and occupies the southwestern end of a narrow submarine ridge that extends to the northeast for several kilometers. Its total land area is only . The island is traditionally held as a food reserve for the family of Joachim and Lijon deBrum, passed down to Lijon debrum from Iroijlaplap Lobareo and is owned by the current Likiep land-owning families of Joachim and Lijon debrum, grandkids of Iroijlaplap Jortõka of Ratak Eañ. There is also a shipwreck of unknown origin on the west side of the island.

First recorded sighting of Jemo Island by Europeans was by the Spanish expedition of Miguel López de Legazpi on 10 January 1565. It was charted as Los Pajaros (The Birds in Spanish).

See also
 Desert island
 List of islands

References

Marshall Islands site

Uninhabited islands of the Marshall Islands
Ratak Chain